Dellwood may refer to a location in the United States:

Dellwood, Minnesota
Dellwood, Missouri
Dellwood, North Carolina
Dellwood, Oregon
Dellwood, Adams County, Wisconsin, an unincorporated community in Adams County, Wisconsin
Dellwood, Sauk County, Wisconsin, an unincorporated community in Sauk County, Wisconsin
Dellwood Country Club, a private country club in New City, New York